Excessive alcohol intake is associated with an elevated risk of alcoholic liver disease (ALD), heart failure, some cancers, and accidental injury, and is a leading cause of preventable death in industrialized countries. Some studies have suggested that one drink per day may have cardiovascular benefits. However, these studies are controversial, and the common view is that no level of alcohol consumption improves health. There is far more evidence for the harmful effects of alcohol than for any beneficial effects. It is also recognized that the alcohol industry may promote the unsubstantiated benefits of moderate drinking.

Alcohol intake and cardiovascular disease 
Some early reviews showed that light alcohol consumption may have a protective effect on cardiovascular health. For instance, a meta-analysis from 2010 found that patients with cardiovascular disease who were light to moderate alcohol consumers, were less likely to suffer from cardiovascular and all-cause mortality. However, the researchers warned against encouraging cardiovascular patients who do not regularly consume alcohol to start drinking due to lack of controlled intervention studies and evidence. 

Several possible mechanisms have been suggested for the cardioprotective effect of alcohol. These include glucose control, lipid metabolism, and metabolism as a whole. However, another possible explanation is that the cardioprotective effect is only a confounding research result. A logical possibility is that some of the alcohol abstainers in research studies previously drank excessively and had undermined their health. After they quit they were categorized as non-drinkers, which in turn lead to more sick people in the non-drinkers category. To test this hypothesis, a 2019 meta analysis has recategorized people accordingly. As a result, no benefit was found for alcohol consumption of any dosage, moreover, alcohol was detrimental to health even at low doses.

The American Heart Association states that drinking too much alcohol increases health risks including cardiovasular disease precursors such as obesity, high blood pressure, high triglycerides and also heart attacks and strokes. They warn that "We’ve all seen the headlines about studies associating light or moderate drinking with health benefits and reduced mortality. Some researchers have suggested there are health benefits from wine, especially red wine, and that a glass a day can be good for the heart. But there’s more to the story. No research has proved a cause-and-effect link between drinking alcohol and better heart health.."

Alcohol reduction 
It is well known that alcohol consumption increases the risk of hypertension. Hence, many clinical trials examined the effect of reduction in alcohol consumption on blood pressure. Systematic review and meta-analysis have shown that effect of alcohol reduction on blood pressure is dose dependent.

I. For people who consumed 2 or fewer drinks per day, blood pressure was not significantly decreased when they reduced alcohol consumption close to abstinence.
II. For people who consumed 3 or more drinks per day, blood pressure was significantly decreased when they reduced alcohol consumption close to abstinence.
III. For people who consumed 6 or more drinks per day, reduction rate on blood pressure was the strongest when they reduced alcohol consumption close to abstinence.
IV. The effect of alcohol reduction on blood pressure is still unclear for women and hypertensive patients who consume less than three drinks per day due to limited clinical trials.

See 
 French paradox
 Long-term effects of alcohol consumption

References

External links 
 USDA Dietary Guidelines for Americans 2005: Chapter 9 Alcoholic Beverages
 Alcohol and heart health: Separating fact from fiction, Johns Hopkins Medicine

Cardiovascular diseases
Health effects of alcohol